is a four-episode anime OVA and theatrical movie in the Macross series. It was the first sequel to the original Macross television series that took place in the official timeline (Macross II was quickly retconned by series creator Shōji Kawamori as a parallel world story in the Macross universe). Plus was a groundbreaking combination of traditional cel and computer-generated animation at the time of its release, paving the way for the incorporation of more computer-generated imagery in Japanese animation.

Both the OVA series and movie were released in Japan by Bandai Visual and in North America and Europe by Manga Entertainment. The Australian VHS version was released by Manga Entertainment and the DVD version by Madman Entertainment under sub-license from Manga Entertainment. It features several new mecha designs inspired by the original series.

Plot
Three decades after the great war between the humans and the Zentradi, in January 2040, the U.N. government is developing new technologies to use in their transforming fighter aircraft by running tests on the colony planet Eden. Military test pilots and former childhood friends, loose cannon Isamu Alva Dyson and the Zentradi mixed race Guld Goa Bowman, are selected to each pilot a new aircraft (Shinsei Industries' YF-19 & General Galaxy's YF-21) for Project Super Nova, to choose the newest successor to the VF-11 Thunderbolt variable fighter which is currently still in use by the U.N. Spacy military forces. Their own personal grudges end up disrupting the tests, and begin to wreak havoc on the program.

Their rivalry heats up when a mutual friend, Myung Fang Lone, shows up. Myung was a childhood friend of both pilots, but the three of them had a falling out, and quickly grew apart. This is alluded to throughout the story, and evidence of the strained relationship between Myung and either of the two men is apparent, while their distaste for one another is obvious. When they meet again, they discover that Myung is now the producer of Sharon Apple, the hottest entertainer in the galaxy, who just happens to be an AI hologram. Unbeknownst to the public, the Sharon AI is incomplete and requires Myung to provide emotions during concerts.

During a testing session, Guld and Isamu finally face off against each other – and an all-out fight begins as each tries to best the other. Despite being in the middle of a testing area, they quickly proceed to tear the surrounding area to shreds in their fight to gain superiority over the other. Having turned off their communications equipment, both pilots fight using the test aircraft in a series of stunning dog-fight maneuvers before going into battroid form and finishing the fight on the ground. In the process, an "accidental" gun pod discharge injures Isamu and he is taken to the hospital, where he awakens to Myung standing watch over him. After returning to duty, a military tribunal questions Guld about their fight in the test area, but ultimately the decision is left up to the Admiral in charge of the project. Chief Millard, the station commander of New Edwards Test Flight Facility, reluctantly tells both pilots that their mission and the project has been scrubbed by the U.N. Spacy High Command – due to the completion of a newer, and previously unknown aircraft, the Ghost X-9 (ゴースト X-9), an advanced stealth UCAV prototype which was secretly being produced on Earth while two other prototypes (YF-19 and YF-21) were simultaneously being tested for Project Super Nova in planet Eden. With the Ghost X-9 completed, testing on the YF-19 and YF-21 was halted indefinitely, since the higher-ups believe that the new unmanned fighter is superior in every way.

Meanwhile, the AI Sharon Apple has developed a malevolent consciousness, due to an illegal bio-chip having been installed by lead scientist on the project, Marge Gueldoa. During her concert in the Atlantis Dome inside Earth's Macross City, Sharon quickly takes over both the Ghost X-9 and the SDF-1 Macross Fortress and hypnotizes her audience and the Macross' staff, while trapping Myung in the Macross itself.

Wanting to prove that manned fighter units are a necessity and to prove his worth, Isamu and Yang (the YF-19's engineer) take the fighter jet and space-fold to Earth to beat the X-9 at its own game, while Guld gives chase in the YF-21. Sharon hacks into Earth's outer space defences, but both Isamu and Guld make it through. They then proceed to attack each other again, as they argue about childhood grudges. At the climax of the fight Guld, finally achieving a target lock, releases a large fury of missiles seemingly destroying the YF-19. As this happens, Guld is flooded by repressed memories. Now realizing it was truly his own jealous rage that had torn the friendship apart. Having saved himself and Yang by cutting engine throttle and gliding, the YF-19 then appears in the skies above Guld and the two old friends reconcile.

When discovering that Myung's life is in danger, Isamu and Guld quickly go to her aid. While Isamu goes after Sharon, Guld fights the X-9 and ultimately destroys it by removing the gravitational safety limiters on his aircraft, and matching the X-9's velocity/maneuverability, which is much higher than normally possible due to it being computer-controlled and having no pilot, until he achieves a target lock and shoots the X-9 down. However, removing the limiters allows Guld to achieve accelerations exceeding human (even Zentradi-Human) limitations, which ultimately leads to his death, the g-forces generated by his piloting literally crushing him even as he crashes the YF-21 into the X-9, destroying it.

While fighting the SDF-1 Macross, Sharon hypnotises Yang who shoots at Isamu but only hits his helmet. Isamu ejected Yang but then is hypnotized by Sharon's voice, and is left to crash to his death. At the last second, Myung's voice reaches him and brings him out back to consciousness. Dodging the Macross' fire, Isamu is able to destroy the central computer, effectively eliminating Sharon.

The story ends as the sun rises over the Macross Fortress, with Myung waving to Isamu, who has survived the destruction of Sharon's computer.

Eventually, the U.N. government banned all AI technology developments after the incident, and allowed the continuation of Project Super Nova.

Production
Following Big West's 1992 release of Macross II (which was subsequently retconned as an alternate universe title), original Macross staff member Shōji Kawamori began work on a true sequel to the original Macross series. To realistically depict the intense flight scenes in the anime, Kawamori – along with action choreographer and animator Ichiro Itano and other staff members – traveled to Edwards Air Force Base (which was the basis for New Edwards Air Force Base on planet Eden in the series) in Edwards, California, for a few training sessions with dogfighting school Air Combat USA. The Advanced Tactical Fighter program of the 1980s was the basis of the Project Supernova contest between the YF-19 and YF-21. Consequently, the YF-21's design was heavily influenced by the Northrop YF-23 while the YF-19 resembles the Grumman X-29 when in jet mode.

The design of Eden City was influenced by the San Francisco landscape (which also served as a backdrop for Frontier City in Macross Frontier). The wind farms throughout the planet were based on those found in California's Central Valley, while Eden's highways were designed from those seen in Orlando, Florida.

The series was directed by Shinichirō Watanabe, featuring character designs by Masayuki and animation direction by Kōji Morimoto, who designed the Sharon Apple concert scene. Shōji Kawamori designed all the new variable fighters in the anime. Kazutaka Miyatake was credited for the use of his previous designs for the Macross and the Destroid Monster, and he was also involved in the project as mecha designer for the YF-21 cockpit, both the YF-21 and YF-19 flightsuits, the X-9 Ghost drone fighter and the renegade Zentradi battlesuits.

Score

Yoko Kanno composed the score for Macross Plus. The orchestral score was recorded in Tel Aviv, Israel, by members of the Israel Philharmonic Orchestra, except for "Dogfight" (an orchestral track used during the final battle between Isamu and Guld), which was recorded in Prague, Czech Republic by the Czech Philharmonic Orchestra.

Sharon Apple's songs are performed by a number of different artists – namely Gabriela Robin, Akino Arai, Mai Yamane, Melodie Sexton, Wuyontana and the Raiché Coutev Sisters. The most notable song in the series is Myung's song "Voices", which is performed by Arai and is the only Japanese-language song in the soundtrack. For the English dub of the series, "Voices" was translated into English and performed by Michelle Flynn. Three songs ("Information High", "The Borderline" and "Pulse") are in English, while "Idol Talk" is in French. Four songs ("After, in the Dark – Torch Song", "Santi-U", "A Sai En" and "Wanna Be an Angel") are sung in the fictional Zentran language.

The soundtrack CDs were released in Japan by Victor Entertainment. In North America, only the first two soundtracks were made available; first through JVC, then subsequently through AnimeTrax (a division of The Right Stuf International).

Versions

Macross Plus OVA
The OVA version (マクロスプラス) consists of four episodes, each approximately 37–40 minutes in length. The Japanese voice cast is as follows:

Isamu Alva Dyson (Takumi Yamazaki)
Guld Goa Bowman (Unshou Ishizuka)
Myung Fang Lone (Rica Fukami)
Lucy McMillan (Megumi Hayashibara)
Sharon Apple (Mako Hyōdō)
Marge Gueldoa (Show Hayami)
Millard Johnson (Kenji Utsumi)
Yang Neumann (Tomohiro Nishimura)
Kate Masseau (Urara Takano)

Macross Plus: International Version
An English dub version was produced for the international market, featuring a North American cast and an English version of the main theme "Voices". When it came to Episode 4 of the original translation, due to a rights issue at the time, the entire soundmix including music and sound effects had to be recreated from scratch. Only the songs performed by Sharon Apple ("Pulse," "Information High," and "Santi-U(second half)/Torch Song") and the English version of "Voices" were retained. The background music entitled "Dogfight" was replaced with another track entitled "Breakout" (featured in Episode 1 and 2), notably in the main Dogfight sequence and just after Isamu recovers from his trance.

It was later that Bandai Visual commissioned a new dub for Episode 4, retaining the original Japanese soundmix but utilizing a new voice cast due to actor availability. Most notably Isamu's part was recast with David Hayter, most famous for his voicework on the Metal Gear series. This version was exclusive to Japan, also being included as the English dub of choice on the Japanese Blu-ray release in 2012, still retaining the original Manga versions of Episodes 1 - 3.

In Japan, this version was released with Japanese subtitles as the "International Version".

Isamu Alva Dyson (Bryan Cranston, David Hayter (Bandai Dub of Episode 4))
Guld Goa Bowman (Richard Epcar, Michael Gregory (Bandai Dub of Episode 4))
Myung Fang Lone (Riva Spier)
Lucy McMillan (Dyanne DiRosario)
Sharon Apple (Melora Harte)
Marge Gueldoa (Steven Blum)
Millard Johnson (Beau Billingslea)
Yang Neumann (Dan Woren, Derek Stephen Prince (Bandai Dub of Episode 4))
Kate Masseau (Edie Mirman)

In January 1998, it broadcast in 3 parts, each twice on midnights on the new Teletoon station in Canada along with the film Ninja Scroll.

Macross Plus: Movie Edition
Scriptwriter Keiko Nobumoto originally wrote Macross Plus as a feature-length work before the script evolved into a four-volume video series. The movie edition returns the story to the initially planned feature length. The theatrical version (マクロスプラス MOVIE EDITION) has approximately 20 minutes of new and alternative footage, though the filmmakers also dropped scenes (such as Isamu's battle training at the beginning of Episode 1). The chronology at the beginning of the story is different as well, with Myung Fang Lone and Sharon Apple appearing almost immediately whereas their entrance does not occur until about 14-15 minutes into Episode 1.

Macross Plus Movie Edition had a limited theatrical release at the Barbican Centre in the UK on September 14, 2019, and in the U.S. through Fathom Events on December 14, 2021.

Home video
Macross Plus was first released in Japan on VHS and Laserdisc formats by Bandai Visual. Manga Entertainment released the series in VHS (dubbed and subtitled versions) and Laserdisc formats in Europe and as their first title in the North American market. The English-dubbed series was also released in MovieCD format for Windows 3.1/Windows 95-based PCs. In 1999, Manga Entertainment released Macross Plus on DVD format, with two episodes per disc. Sales of disc 2 of the series were affected by a subtitle timing error, which was corrected on subsequent reprints.

A subtitle-only version of Macross Plus: Movie Edition was released on VHS in the U.S. through Manga Entertainment, with a DVD release in 2000. The DVD version is a direct transfer from the VHS release, causing the subtitles to be part of the footage itself, so they can't be turned off. There is no English dub for the movie version.

To celebrate the 30th Anniversary of Macross in 2012, both the OVA and the Movie Edition were remastered into HD and released as part of The Super Dimension Macross Blu-ray Boxset Complete Edition, containing all the Macross series and films produced to that point (also remastered in HD). A separate Blu-ray of the OVA and Movie Edition was released in early 2013 as the Macross Plus Complete Blu-ray Box. Both OVA releases featured the International Version English dubs as a language track, with Episode 4 using the newer Bandai dub while retaining the original Manga dubs for the first 3 episodes. Both these Blu-ray releases are only available in Japan.

Merchandise

Books
During the release of the series, Shogakukan published the companion visual book This Is Animation Special: Macross Plus, which covered the first two episodes. A follow-up book was released, covering the production of the Movie Edition.

Toys
Macross Plus toys were not available until 2000, when Yamato Toys released a 1/72 scale diecast replica of the YF-19. Since then, aside from Yamato, replicas and figures of the series' variable fighters have been manufactured by Doyusha and Kaiyodo (under the Revoltech line).

None of these toys are widely available in the U.S. due to ongoing legal disputes between Big West and Tatsunoko Production/Harmony Gold USA over the Macross copyright.

Model kits
Hasegawa Hobby Kits released non-transforming model kits of the YF-19 and YF-21 in fighter modes between 2001 and 2002. The molds for both planes were re-used for the VF-19A (from Macross VF-X2) and VF-22S (from Macross 7), respectively.

Resin and garage kits of the Macross Plus variable fighters have been manufactured by several different companies in Japan. The most well-known of these kits is the 1/100 Perfect Variable YF-19 by Studio HalfEye, which became the basis for Yamato Toys' 1/72 diecast toy.

Manga adaptation
A new manga adaptation of the anime is being serialized by comic publisher Kadokawa Comics A with the name Macross Plus: TAC Name. The story of the comic is a retelling of the events from the anime as well as a more detailed description of the background and past history of the characters. The artist of the manga is Naoki Moriya and is available since February 10, 2012.

Macross Plus: Game Edition 
A video game adaptation of the original OVA (マクロスプラス -Game Edition-) was released in 2000 in Japan only. This PlayStation game by Shoeisha Co. Ltd. features some members of the original cast and staff, and includes parts of the original soundtrack, as well as some cutscenes in the form of excerpts from the Movie Edition of Macross Plus.

The game features the variable fighters and mecha used in the OVA, as well as select units from the original Macross series. It also introduces the Neo Glaug (a transformable version of the Zentradi battle pod) as an in-game exclusive. Unlike other Macross games, transformation of variable fighters is not possible during gameplay; each level has the player's unit fixed in one mode only. Aside from the single-player story mode, two players can battle each other in vs. mode.

This 3D home software is completely different from the vertical-scrolling arcade shooter released in Japan by Banpresto in 1997 as Macross Plus (マクロスプラス) which is loosely based on the franchise.

References

External links
Macross Official Web Site 

Fan sites
Macross Plus at Macross Compendium
Macross Plus at Macross Mecha Manual
Macross Plus at Mecha and Anime Headquarters

1994 anime OVAs
1995 anime films
Films directed by Shinichirō Watanabe
Japanese aviation films
Drone films
Films about test pilots
Films set in 2040
Plus
Madman Entertainment anime
Manga Entertainment